The University of the Philippines Visayas Main Building, also sometimes referred to as the Old Iloilo City Hall, is a historic building in Iloilo City which currently serves as the primary building of the Iloilo City campus of the University of the Philippines (UP) Visayas. It was previously used as the city hall for Iloilo City.

History
Construction of the UP Visayas Main Building began in February 1931 and was used to host the Iloilo City Hall as early as 1935. It was inaugurated in December 1936. The building stands in a  lot which was donated to the local government of Iloilo City. During the Japanese occupation of the Philippines during World War II, Japanese soldiers occupied the building in 1942 and made it as their garrison. The Japanese occupied the building until 1945.

In 1945, while the war was still ongoing Iloilo City Council passed Resolution No. 485 which concerns the establishment of a junior college for the University of the Philippines Iloilo. The city council approved the Resolution No. 461 after the war, donating the old city hall to the UP Iloilo College which opened in July 1947. It was transferred to the educational institute under the administration of then-Iloilo City Mayor Fernando Lopez and it was repaired in 1950 through the efforts of the Philippine War Damage Commission.

The building was reopened to the public on August 16, 2019.

Architecture and design
The building was made in the neo-classical design. The law and order bronze male statues present in the building's facade was made by Italian sculptor Francesco Riccardo Monti. The building's main features are the Court Room and the Session Hall, the latter which is also known as the Lozano Hall.

Tenants
The building briefly served as the Iloilo City Hall and later a garrison of soldiers of Imperial Japan during the World War II era. As of 2019, the building hosts the office of the Center for West Visayan Studies as well as an art gallery.

See also
Iloilo City Hall
Philippines National Historical Landmarks

References

Neoclassical architecture in the Philippines
Juan M. Arellano buildings
Buildings and structures in Iloilo City